Chanos de Somerón (Llanos in Spanish) is one of 24 parishes (administrative divisions) in Lena, a municipality within the province and autonomous community of Asturias, in coastal northern Spain.

Chanos is the only village in the parroquia. It is well known because of its famous peas (arbeyos in Asturian).

References

External links
 Asturian society of economic and industrial studies, English-language version of "Sociedad Asturiana de Estudios Económicos e Industriales" (SADEI)

Parishes in Lena